General George Frederick Upton, 3rd Viscount Templetown  (5 August 1802 – 4 January 1890), styled The Honourable George Upton until 1863, was an Irish soldier and politician.

Military career
Upton was the second son of John Upton, 1st Viscount Templetown of Botleys, Surrey.

He joined the British Army in 1823 and was promoted lieutenant in 1825, captain in 1826, major in 1837, and lieutenant-colonel in 1841, all in the 62nd Foot, with the exception of the period 13 February 1827 to 8 June 1830 when serving as a Captain with 60th rifles.

In 1842 he transferred to be captain and lieutenant-colonel in the Coldstream Guards. He was a major and brevet colonel in command of 1st Battalion in the Crimea in 1854–55, taking part in the Battles of the Alma and Inkerman and was made CB in 1855 and major general in 1858. He was made a commander of the Legion of Honour in 1856 and awarded the Order of the Medjidie (fourth class) in 1858.

In 1859 he was returned to parliament for County Antrim, a seat he held until 1863, when he succeeded his childless elder brother in the viscountcy. In 1866 he was elected an Irish Representative Peer.

Promoted lieutenant-general, he became general officer commanding Western District at Devonport in January 1865 and general officer commanding Southern District at Portsmouth in August 1870.

He was briefly colonel of the 90th Foot in 1862 before transferring to be colonel of 2nd Battalion, 60th Rifles from 1862 to 1876 and then the 2nd Life Guards from 1876 until his death in 1890. He was elevated to KCB in 1869 and promoted full general on 6 April 1873. He was further elevated to GCB in 1886.

Lord Templetown died in January 1890, aged 87, and was buried at Castle Upton, County Antrim. He had married Susan Woodford, the daughter of Field Marshal Sir Alexander Woodford GCB and was succeeded in the viscountcy by his nephew, Henry.

References

External links

|-

|-

1802 births
1890 deaths
Viscounts in the Peerage of Ireland
Irish representative peers
Knights Grand Cross of the Order of the Bath
Irish Conservative Party MPs
Members of the Parliament of the United Kingdom for County Antrim constituencies (1801–1922)
UK MPs 1859–1865
Templetown, V3
British Army generals
Coldstream Guards officers
Wiltshire Regiment officers
British Army personnel of the Crimean War
Recipients of the Order of the Medjidie, 4th class